The Conservative Party of Washington was a short-lived third party in the State of Washington, founded by Floyd Paxton and other ultra-conservatives in 1966. After its founding convention, the party filed nominations for two candidates for the United States House of Representatives (one of them Paxton) and seven candidates for the Washington State Legislature. The new party attracted some disaffected members of the Republican Party of Washington unhappy with the leadership of Governor Daniel J. Evans and his allies. While Paxton and some other party leaders were identified as supporters of Alabama governor George Wallace's 1968 candidacy for President of the United States, the Wallace campaign finally did not use the Conservative label, choosing instead to run under the American Party label. The Conservatives did run candidates in 1968 for a handful of state-wide offices and one candidate for Congress, but now appeared under the Constitution Party label. Neither label appeared on the 1970 ballot, although 1968 gubernatorial candidate Ken Chriswell was an independent candidate for State Senator in District #34.

References 

Political parties in Washington (state)
Defunct state and local conservative parties in the United States
Political parties established in 1966
History of Washington (state)
1966 establishments in Washington (state)